As a surname, Sokolow may refer to:
 Nahum Sokolow (1859-1936), Jewish Hebrew language writer and Zionist leader
 Americans:
 Anna Sokolow (1910 – 2000),  dancer and choreographer
 Tobi Sokolow (born 1942),  bridge player
 Fred Sokolow (born 1945),  string musician
 Alec Sokolow (born 1963),  screenwriter 
 Deb Sokolow (born 1974),  artist
 Julie Sokolow (born 1987),  film director, musician, and writer

See also

 Sokolov (disambiguation)
 Sokoloff

Slavic-language surnames
Jewish surnames